Mainpuri Junction is on the Shikohabad-Farrukhabad branch line. It is located in Mainpuri district in the Indian state of Uttar Pradesh. It serves Mainpuri and the surrounding areas.

History
A branch line was opened from Shikohabad to Mainpuri in 1905 and extended to Farrukhabad in 1906.

The Etawah–Mainpuri link rout has started.

Development
Electrification is continuing on Shikohabad-Farrukhabad route.
Electrification work will soon start on the Mainpuri-Etawah route.
Etah-Gursahayganj via Mainpuri New Route:Bhogaon: A survey of a new railway line has been started by the Railways to improve rail connectivity in the district.  The survey process has started on the new railway line from Gurusahaiganj to Etah district of Kannauj district.  The new railway line can be laid through the GT Road bank in the district.  As soon as the report of the survey is received, the Railways will decide in advance about the new line.

References

External links
 Trains at Mainpuri

Railway stations in Mainpuri district
Allahabad railway division